Rajendra Mahato (born 19 November 1958) is a Nepalese politician, who was serving as the Deputy Prime Minister and Minister for Urban Development since 4 June 2021 but was removed from the post by Supreme Court on 22 June 2021 making the tenure of just 18 days and shortest till date. He was the parliamentary party leader of the People's Socialist Party, Nepal, although the status matter of conflict within the party. Though weak today due to continuous party change, he once was a well known leader of Terai-Madhesh based political alliance. Now, he is thought to move to Sarlahi 4. He has previously contested the election from Sarlahi and Dhanusha where his party could win no local level head position and got clean swept in recent election.

Political career
He started his political career from 1990. In the 1994 parliamentary election, he stood as the Nepal Sadbhavana Party candidate in the constituency Sarlahi-2. He came second with 10173 votes. In the 1999 parliamentary election he won the seat with 14750 votes, defeating former Prime Minister Surya Bahadur Thapa of the Rastriya Prajatantra Party.  Mahato resigned from the interim parliament on January 19, 2008.

In 2007, Mahato broke away from Nepal Sadbhavana Party (Anandidevi) and formed his own party, which later acquired the name Sadbhavana Party. Mahato has never had a stable political party. He joined Rastriya Janata Party. Later he joined Janata Samajbadi Party. In few months, he broke the party to join Loktantrik Samajbadi Party.

In April 2008, he won the Sarlahi-4 seat in the Constituent Assembly election.

Mahato lost his seat in the 2013 constituent assembly elections to Mahendra Rai Yadav of the Terai Madesh Sadhbhawana Party Nepal.  The party nominated his wife Sahil Devi Mahato to the Constituent Assembly from the two seats assigned to the party under proportional representation.

Mahato had also become a leader for the Madhesi people, and stated concerns about Nepal's proposed constitution, calling it a ploy to subjugate the Madhesi. On 4 June 2021, he surprisingly joined Second Oli cabinet led by KP Oli whom he criticized the most.

Personal life
Mahato was born in Sarlahi district of eastern Nepal, on 19 November 1958, as the first child of Khobhari Mahato but it remains disputed and a large mass of people believe him to have born in Bihar, India. This claimed by CPN-UML youth wing's present vice-president, Sanjeev Jha.

Controversies 
Burning a copy of newly promulgated constitution of Nepal

After the promulgation of Constitution of Nepal, a long strike was brought in light by the then Madheshi morcha mainly in terai of Nepal. Mahato burned a copy of Constitution of Nepal at the premises of Narayani Sub-regional hospital, Birgunj stating that he cannot accept the constitution which failed to integrate and maintain the Madhesi's rights at any cost. Mahato in one of this statement said;“The constitution, in favour of Koirala, Oli and Dahal, promulgated amid violence initiated by the government itself, will never be acceptable to us.”  He pictured Prime-minister Oli of being the biggest enemy of Madhesh and Madheshi people many times in past. He had once said;"Oli’s patriotism, protest against India won’t benefit country." On 4 June 2021, he surprisingly joined second oli cabinet.

Birth and Citizenship

Mahato was rumoured to be one of eight politicians whose citizenship were annulled in August 2019 when the cabinet decided to cancel the citizenship of individuals who acquired Nepali citizenship through forged documents. Although the government has published the name of the individuals, their full details are yet undisclosed. This came into light after few youth of UML's youth organization pleaded for cancelling the citizenship of Mahato and re-verify it. For the same purpose a group of youth including Sanjeev Jha submitted an application to the then incumbent Home minister shakti Bahadur Basnet during First oli premiership. On 21 June 2021, a note was pasted on main gate of Singhadurbar by Naya Party to restrict the entry of Mahato in the premises. On 22 June 2021, a complain numbered C035596 was lodged at CIAA, the concerned authority again to investigate his citizenship by advocate Birbhadra Joshi, Tulsi Ram Parajuli and Anil Bajgain.

Demand for multi nation state

On 4 June 2021, a group of PSP-N lead by Mahantha Thakur accepted the proposal of PM KP Sharma Oli of joining the government. Rajendra Mahato led a group of 8 ministers and 2 state ministers to government. However, a statement of him was highly criticized. Mahato included a line; “We remain committed to building an alternative power and will safeguard identity and rights of our people. As long as we are in power, we will pursue good governance. We will prepare for a nationwide movement to set up multi-nation state in Nepal.”  The comment drew quick criticism on social media twitter, Facebook and tik-tok which accused Mr. Mahato of playing divisive politics. It was disliked by many high-ranked political leader of CPN-UML , leading the government. Yogesh Bhattarai, a UML leader famous among youth urged Prime Minister Oli to advise his ministerial colleagues to be restrained in public comments. On the other hand, protest was organised on Saturday by the All Nepal National Free Students Union (ANNFSU) that demanded prime-minister Oli to step down over the comments. This statement was also criticized by 12 different wings of CPN-UML. Due to high pressure and criticism, Mahato had no other alternative than taking his statement back. Due to this, took his statement back on mid-night of 5 May 2021.

Electoral history 
As of 2013, Mr. Mahato has given candidacy in 5 election from 1991 to 2013 where he lost in 3 while won in only one from Sarlahi-2 and Sarlahi-4 each of 3 elections and 2 respectively. In 2017, he filled his candidacy from Dhanusha-3 due to dispute between him and Mahendra Raya Yadav for Sarlahi 2  as both were in same party while Yadav remained much powerful in the constituency of Mahato. Hence, he came to Dhanusha-3, a prominent constituency of Nidhi where majority voters are Yadav-Sudi. Due to this factor and alliance between RJP-FSF where UML supported externally as none among RJP-FSF alliance and UML led Left-Alliance could win single-handedly, as a result he won here with joint votes of duo alliance. Mr Mahato is thought to be near to KP Oli since this time and this alliance is still continuing though Ex-FSF has withdrawn its hand.

2017 legislative elections 

2013 Constituent Assembly Election

2008 Constituent Assembly election

1994 legislative elections

1991 legislative elections

See also 

 People's Progressive Party

References

1958 births
Living people
Nepal Sadbhawana Party politicians
Sadbhavana Party politicians
Madhesi people
People from Sarlahi District
Nepal MPs 2017–2022
Nepal MPs 1999–2002
People from Saharsa district
Deputy Prime Ministers of Nepal
Members of the 1st Nepalese Constituent Assembly
Rastriya Janata Party Nepal politicians
People's Socialist Party, Nepal politicians
Loktantrik Samajwadi Party, Nepal politicians